Look The National Federation of Families with Visually Impaired Children is a United Kingdom charity which was set up to support families when children have a visual impairment. The charity creates opportunities for parents to get together and offers an information and support service. It also has a magazine for parents and an audio magazine produced by young people with a visual impairment.

In 2007, a group of visually impaired students, together with the charity and The National Archives, created Prisoner 4099, a radio play about a 12-year-old Victorian boy who was sent to prison for theft. The website about the project won a Jodi Award for accessibility.

References

External links

Charities for disabled people based in the United Kingdom